Go Ahead! is the third studio album by Japanese singer-songwriter Tatsuro Yamashita, released in December 1978.

Overview
"A masterpiece third solo album that marked the creativity of Yamashita's brilliant and versatile writing style which determined his subsequent path."

In commercial music, etc., there was a high demand for Yamashita as a musician who works under anonymity, but Yamashita's evaluation as a contract musician for a record company, was favorable, but he wasn't meeting the sales figures RCA wanted. Yamashita himself felt that the world of rock and folk that he had lived in had entered a new stage at that time, and thought that if he went on like this, he would probably have to give up his records and live activities. So he had a pessimistic prediction that this album would probably be the last. The album was criticized by critics and listeners for being disorganized, but it can be said that the writer's principle, which began to suffer, was the sprout of the album production policy that followed. However Tatsuro Yamashita was told that one of his songs in the Go Ahead! album "Bomber" was a hit song in a disco in Osaka. Therefore, in 1979, a promotional single was released under the title of "Bomber".

The songs "Let's Dance Baby", "Bomber" & "潮騒 (The Whispering Sea)" would've be featured in his 1982 greatest hits album "Greatest Hits! of Tatsuro Yamashita". Meanwhile, the song "This Could Be The Night" would get re-recorded in 1984 as part of his soundtrack album "Big Wave".

In 2002, a remastered reissue (BVCR-17015) was released as part of The RCA/AIR Years 1976–1982 series. The reissue would include remastered tracks and three additional tracks that were previously unreleased before. It would enter the Oricon charts, peaking in at number twenty-five.

Track listing

2002 remastered edition

Personnel

Overture
Tatsuro Yamashita: All Voices

 1978 P.M.P.

Love Celebration
Tatsuro Yamashita: Electric Guitar (Left), Hammond organ & Vibraphone

Yutaka Uehara: Drums

Akihiro Tanaka: Bass

Kazuo Shiina: Electric Guitar (Right)

Hiroyuki Namba: Electric Piano

Shigeharu Mukai: Trombone

Tadanori Kogawa: Trombone

Takeru Muraoka: Tenor Sax

Shunzo Sunahara: Baritone Sax

Tadaaki Ohno: Strings Concert Master

© 1977 ALFA MUSIC LTD.

Let's Dance Baby
Tatsuro Yamashita: Electric Guitar (Left), Percussion, Bang! & Background Vocals

Yutaka Uehara: Drums & Percussion

Hiroyuki Namba: Electric Piano

Akihiro Tanaka: Bass & Percussion

Kazuo Shiina: Electric Guitar (Right) & Percussion

Hiroyuki Namba: Keyboards & Percussion

Tomoo Okazaki: Alto Sax Solo

Minako Yoshida: Background Vocals

Ryuzo Kosugi: Background Vocals

© 1978 J&K MUSIC PUB.

Monday Blue
Shuichi "Ponta" Murakami:  Drums

Akira Okazawa: Bass

Tsunehide Matsuki: Electric Guitar

Hiroshi Sato: Keyboards

Keiko Yamakawa: Harp

Tadaaki Ohno: Strings Concert Master

© 1978 P.M.P.

ついておいで (Follow Me Along)

Tatsuro Yamashita: Electric Guitar (Left) & Background Vocals

Yutaka Uehara: Drums

Akihiro Tanaka: Bass

Kazuo Shiina: Electric Guitar (Right)

Hiroyuki Namba: Electric Piano

Motoya Hamaguchi: Percussion

Shigeharu Mukai: Trombone Solo

Minako Yoshida: Background Vocals

© 1978 P.M.P.

Bomber
Tatsuro Yamashita: Electric Guitar & Background Vocals

Yutaka Uehara: Drums

Akihiro Tanaka: Bass

Kazuo Shiina: Electric Guitar Solo

Hiroyuki Namba: Keyboards

Minako Yoshida: Background Vocals

© 1978 P.M.P.

潮騒 (The Whispering Sea)

(Same personnel for the English version)

Tatsuro Yamashita: Electric Guitar, Arp Odyssey Synthesizer (Bass), Percussion & Background Vocals

Yutaka Uehara: Drums

Akihiro Tanaka: Bass

Hiroyuki Namba: Acoustic Piano

Chuei Yoshikawa: Acoustic Guitar

Ryuichi Sakamoto: KORG PS-3100 Synthesizer

Motoya Hamaguchi: Percussion

Minako Yoshida: Background Vocals

© 1978 P.M.P.

Paper Doll
Tatsuro Yamashita: Electric Guitar, Percussion & Background Vocals

Yutaka Uehara: Drums

Akihiro Tanaka: Bass

Ryuichi Sakamoto: Keyboards

Minako Yoshida: Background Vocals

© 1978 P.M.P.

This Could Be The Night
Tatsuro Yamashita: Drums, Bass, Electric Guitar, Acoustic Piano, Glockenspiel, Percussion, & Background Vocals

Chuei Yoshikawa: Acoustic Guitar

Ryuichi Sakamoto: Poly Moog Synthesizer

Motoya Hamaguchi: Percussion

© ROCK MUSIC

2000トンの雨 (2000t Of Rain)
Tatsuro Yamashita: Electric Guitar, Percussion & Background Vocals

Yutaka Uehara: Drums

Akihiro Tanaka: Bass

Ryuichi Sakamoto: Acoustic Piano

Tomoo Okazaki: Alto Sax Solo

Ryuzo Kosugi: Percussion

Minako Yoshida: Background Vocals

Tadaaki Ohno: Strings Concert Master

© 1978 P.M.P.

Credits
"From the inner sleeve notes of the album (RVL-8037)."

PRODUCED BY TATSURO YAMASHITA FOR P.M.P. INC

ALL SONGS ARRANGED BY TATSURO YAMASHITA

Directed by Ryuzo "Junior" Kosugi (RCA)

Engineered by Tamotsu Yoshida

Session Co-odinater – Ryuzo Kosugi

Disk Mastering Engineer – Tohru Kotetsu

Assistant Engineer – Toshihiro Itoh (Onkio Haus)

Mastering Studio: Nihon Victor Yokohama Mastering Studio

Art Direction – Kenkichi Satoh

Cover Design – Kenkichi Satoh, Akira Sugiyama

Special thanks to Akira Ikuta, Kunio Muramatsu for their assistance

ALL SONGS PUBLISHED BY  1978 P.M.P., 1977 P.M.P., EXCEPT; "LOVE CELEBRATION" BY   1977 ALFA MUSIC LTD.,

"LET'S DANCE BABY" BY  1978 J&K MUSIC PUB., "THIS COULD BE THE NIGHT" BY  ROCK MUSIC, THE RIGHTS FOR JAPAN ASSIGNED TO TOSHIBA MUSIC PUB.

Chart positions

Release history

References

1978 albums
Tatsuro Yamashita albums